Harry Sinclair is an actor.

Harry Sinclair may also refer to:

Harry Ford Sinclair, American industrialist
Harry Sinclair (Neighbours), fictional character on the Australian soap opera Neighbours

See also
Henry Sinclair (disambiguation)
Harold Sinclair (disambiguation)